HMS Barfleur was a  of the Royal Navy (RN). She was named after the Battle of Barfleur, which involved an Anglo-Dutch Fleet against the French in 1692.

Barfleur was built by Swan Hunter & Wigham Richardson Limited on the Tyne. She was launched on 1 November 1943 and commissioned on 14 September 1944.

Second World War Service
Barfleur was the only ship of the class to see action during the Second World War. She joined the British Pacific Fleet upon commission, seeing action during the campaign against Japan.

She was present in Tokyo Bay when the Japanese signed the official surrender on the deck of the US battleship  on 2 September 1945.

Post War Service
In 1946, Barfleur deployed to the Far East along with the rest of the 19th Destroyer Flotilla, performing a variety of duties, including visiting many ports on 'fly-the-flag' visits. Barfleur returned to the United Kingdom with the rest of her flotilla in 1947, and was subsequently placed in Reserve.

In 1953, Barfleur took part in the Fleet Review at Spithead in celebration of the Coronation of Queen Elizabeth II.

Barfleur also became Captain (D) of the 3rd Destroyer Flotilla,  which served in the Mediterranean. While there, Barfleur picked up survivors from a Handley Page Hastings that had crashed in the region. Upon the completion of her task, Barfleur returned the aeroplane's crew to Malta. In 1954, Barfleur moved back home but was returned to the Mediterranean the following year.

The destroyer was involved in the Suez War in 1956, taking part in the Allied landings  in early November. Barfleur returned home later in the year for the last time to join the Home Fleet.

In 1958, Barfleur was put in Reserve before being placed on the disposal list and broken up at Dalmuir in 1966.

References

Publications
Alston, J.R. Lieut R.N. (no date) (no publisher).H.M.S.BARFLUER Pacific Commission 1944-1946

External links
The Battle class destroyers

 

Battle-class destroyers of the Royal Navy
Ships built by Swan Hunter
Ships built on the River Tyne
1943 ships
World War II destroyers of the United Kingdom
Cold War destroyers of the United Kingdom